(John) Keith Russell (14 August 1916 – 1 September 1979) was a British Anglican bishop in Uganda.

Russell was educated at Shrewsbury School; Christ's College, Cambridge; and Ridley Hall, Cambridge. He was ordained deacon in 1940 and priest in 1941. After a curacy in Southampton he was a lecturer at Buwalasi College, Uganda from 1946 to 1948; and Rural Dean of Masaba from 1948 to 1952. Russell was education secretary for the Mbale archdeaconry from 1948 to 1955; and Assistant Bishop on the Upper Nile from 1955 to 1960. He was the Bishop of Northern Uganda from 1961 to 1964. Returning to England he was vicar of Tunbridge Wells from 1965; then rector of Hever with Markbeech from 1973 until his death; he was also an Assistant Bishop of Rochester throughout his time in Kent.

References

20th-century Anglican bishops in Uganda
Anglican bishops on the Upper Nile
Anglican bishops of Northern Uganda
Alumni of Christ's College, Cambridge
Alumni of Ridley Hall, Cambridge
Bulwalasi Theological College faculty
1916 births
1979 deaths